"I Don't Belong in This Club" is a song performed by American boy band Why Don't We and American rapper and songwriter Macklemore. The song was released as a digital download on March 20, 2019 by Signature and Atlantic Records. The song was written by Ben Haggerty, Jacob Manson, Max Wolfgang and Zak Abel.

Music video
A music video to accompany the release of "I Don't Belong in This Club" was first released onto YouTube on March 20, 2019. The video was directed by Jason Koenig.

Track listing

Personnel
Credits adapted from Tidal.

 Corbyn Besson – vocals
 Daniel Seavey – vocals
 Jack Avery – vocals
 Jonah Marais – vocals
 Ben Haggerty – vocals
 Zach Herron – vocals
 Jacob Manson – bass, drums, keyboard, voice
 Simon Clarke – alto saxophone, baritone saxophone, horn
 Max McElligot – background vocals, bass, guitar, keyboards
 Max Wolfgang – background vocals, bass guitar, guitar, keyboards
 Zak Abel – background vocals, writer
 Jane Oliver – cello
 Rosie Danvers – cello, strings
 Tim Sanders – tenor saxophone
 David Liddell – trombone
 Richard Henry – Trombone
 Ryan Quigley – trumpet
 Emma Owens – viola
 Rebecca Jones – viola
 Alison Dods – violin
 Debbie Widdup – violin
 Gillon Cameron – violin
 Hayley Pomfrett – violin
 Jenny Sacha – violin
 Natalia Bonner – violin
 Patrick Kiernan – violin
 Steve Morris – violin
 Zara Benyounes – violin

Production
 Jacob Manson – producer, engineer
 Adam Lunn – engineer
 Benjamin Rice – engineer, vocal producer
 Nick Taylor – engineer
 Tommy Danvers – engineer, strings
 Chris Gheringer – masterer
 Aaron Mattes – mixer
 Erik Madrid – mixer

Charts

Certifications

Release history

References

2019 singles
2019 songs
Macklemore songs
Why Don't We songs
Songs written by Macklemore
Songs written by Jacob Manson